The Fargo-class cruisers were a modified version of the  design; the main difference was a more compact pyramidal superstructure with single trunked funnel, intended to improve the arcs of fire of the anti-aircraft (AA) guns. Changes were made in order to reduce the instability of the Cleveland-class light cruisers, especially their tendency to roll dangerously. The main battery turrets sat about a foot lower and the wing gunhouses (the 5 inch, twin gun mounts on the sides of the ship) were lowered to the main deck. The medium (40 mm) anti-aircraft mounts were also lowered.

Fargo, the lead ship of the class, was launched on 25 February 1945, but was not commissioned until 9 December 1945, four months after the war ended. Huntington was commissioned early in 1946.  The two ships were decommissioned in 1949–1950, and never reactivated.

Ships in class

See also
 List of cruisers of the United States Navy

References

Bibliography

External links

Global Security.org - Fargo-class cruiser
Global Security.org - Fargo-class cruiser specifications
Hazegray - US Cruisers List: US Light/Heavy/AntiAircraft Cruisers, Part 2
Fargo Class Light Cruisers

 
Cruiser classes